Race of Remembrance is the brain child of Jon Earp, Mission Motorsport volunteer and a Welsh Air Ambulance pilot.

The race raised money for the Mission Motorsport charity,  affiliated with Help for Heroes. Mission Motorsport are appointed by the British Army Motorsport Association, and operating in direct support of the Defence Recovery Capability, Mission Motorsport provides respite, rehabilitation, vocational support and training to those affected by military operations within the framework of Motorsport. Mission Motorsport concentrate on getting injured service personnel back into civilian life after injuries sustained on active duty.

An array of professional drivers showed their support of the charity, these include Tom Onslow-Cole Paul O’Neil, Dan Welch, Calum Lockie, Elliott Cole along with Mission Motorsport founder Major James Cameron and Jon Earp. Appearances also include ex professional footballer Luther Blissett and Radio Le Mans commentator John Hindhaugh.

The race was hosted by Anglesey Circuit and was also donated free by the track owners for the duration of the event.

The race paused at 10:45am on 9 November 2014 for a remembrance service held in the pit lane by army chaplain Reverend David Banbury. The 8 hour endurance race was the first in history to pause for a remembrance service midway through the race.

A documentary about the race - and the work of Mission Motorsport -  "Race of Remembrance with Mazda" is to be broadcast on Sky 2, Sky Sports 1, 3 & 4 and Sky Sports F1 from Monday 23 February 2015. Presented by Richard Parks, produced by Princess Productions for Mazda UK.

Class structure 2014

Class A) Up to 2000cc (multi valve)

Class B) Up to 2000cc (2V per cylinder) or 1800cc (multi valve)

Class C) Up to 1800cc (2V per cylinder) or 1600cc (multi valve)

Class D) Below 1600cc (2V per cylinder) or 1400cc (multi valve)

2014 Results

Class structure 2017

Class A) Up to 1600cc

Class B) Citroen C1 Challenge

Class C) Caterham

Class D) Up to 1800cc

Class E) Up to 2000cc

Class F) Invitation

2017 Results

References

External links

Auto races in the United Kingdom
Endurance motor racing
2014 in British motorsport